Pale Moon is an open-source web browser with an emphasis on customization; its motto is "Your browser, Your way". There are official releases for Microsoft Windows and Linux, as well as contributed builds for various platforms.

Pale Moon originated as a fork of Firefox, but has subsequently diverged. The main differences are the user interface, add-on support, and running in single-process mode. Pale Moon retains the highly customizable user interface of the Firefox version 4–28 era. It also continues to support some types of add-ons and plugins that are no longer supported by Firefox, including NPAPI plugins such as Adobe Flash Player, as well as legacy Firefox extensions.

Overview
Pale Moon has diverged from Firefox in a number of ways:
Uses the pre-Australis user interface ("Strata") as carried by Firefox during versions 4-28
Supports extensions built with XUL and XPCOM, which are no longer supported by Firefox
Supports "Complete Themes", add-ons which can customize the entire UI of the browser. Firefox no longer supports this and retains limited options for UI customization.
Supports NPAPI plugins indiscriminately, all of which are no longer supported by Firefox
Replaces the Gecko browser engine with the Goanna fork 
Always runs in single-process mode, whereas Firefox became a multi-process program
Defaults to a customizable start page in cooperation with start.me
Defaults to DuckDuckGo as the search engine instead of Google or Yahoo!
Uses the IP-API service instead of Google's for geolocation

Unified XUL Platform (UXP)
Pale Moon is built upon the Unified XUL Platform (UXP), a cross-platform, multimedia application base with ancestry in Mozilla code. It includes the Goanna layout and rendering engine, a fork of Mozilla's Gecko engine. Moonchild Productions develops UXP alongside Pale Moon.

UXP is a fork of the Firefox 52 ESR platform, created in 2017 to address the imminent death of XUL/XPCOM technology in the Firefox codebase.

License

Pale Moon's source code is available under the Mozilla Public License 2.0, with exceptions for image assets relating to the branding. To ensure quality, redistribution of officially branded Pale Moon binaries is only permissible under the project's proprietary redistribution license. The binary redistribution license prohibits altering the application binary, charging a fee, bundling other software, or collecting personal data. The name and logo are trademarked and cannot be used without prior permission. Unofficial builds of Pale Moon use either unbranded assets from the source code or custom artwork.

Platforms

Moonchild Productions offers Pale Moon for modern iterations of the Microsoft Windows and Linux operating systems. An SSE2-capable processor is required to run the official Pale Moon releases, regardless of operating system choice. For Windows, the only requirement is Windows 7 with Service Pack 1 or newer. On Linux, specific versions of GTK 2 or 3, GLib, Pango, and libstdc++ are required. Moonchild Productions also provides a portable version of Pale Moon for Windows.

Additional "contributed" builds of Pale Moon are produced by community members and may or may not carry the official Pale Moon branding, depending on their level of association and collaboration with Moonchild Productions. These third-party builds range from simple compiler optimizations to support for additional operating systems.

Debian and Ubuntu repositories for Pale Moon are maintained by Steve Pusser and endorsed by Moonchild Productions. These repositories provide the latest Pale Moon updates only for recent Debian and Ubuntu major releases.
Pale Moon for macOS is supported in part by community contributions to the Pale Moon and UXP codebases. Since March 2021, macOS is no longer supported; however, this decision has since been reconsidered, and Pale Moon may return to macOS in a future release.

Platforms no longer supported
Official support for Windows XP ended with Pale Moon 25.0.0. Two speciality builds continued to support XP for some time: PM4XP, which was discontinued after release 25.7.0, and a special build intended for devices with Intel Atom processors, which was discontinued with the release of Pale Moon 27.0.0.

Pale Moon 27.9.4 was the last release to officially support Windows Vista as well as the final community-contributed release for Mac OS X 10.6 Snow Leopard.

Pale Moon for Android was a distinct development effort that is no longer maintained. First released in 2014, it was announced the following year that this Pale Moon variant would likely be abandoned due to lack of community involvement. The final release was 25.9.6.

History

Origins 

M.C. Straver is the project founder and lead developer. Straver's first official release of Pale Moon, in 2009, was a rebuild of Firefox 3.5.2 with minor tweaks. Eventually the scope of the project grew, and version 24 became a true fork of Firefox 24 ESR. Starting with version 25, Pale Moon began using its own versioning scheme.

Diverging from Firefox 
Pale Moon 27 (codenamed "Tycho") was a major re-fork of the core browser code to Firefox 38 Extended Support Release, which added HTTP/2, DirectX 11, MSE/DASH, and JavaScript ES6 capabilities. Add-on support remained almost entirely unchanged, with a slight reduction of Jetpack compatibility.

In 2017, the Pale Moon team began the Unified XUL Platform project, seeking to fork Firefox's platform code one final time, before Mozilla fully removed the XUL/XPCOM technology. A new browser, Basilisk, was created as a "reference application" for developing UXP. Like Pale Moon, Basilisk is a fork of Firefox with substantial divergence from Mozilla's browser. The first incarnation of UXP (codenamed "Möbius") was based on Firefox 53-55, but complications arose with building non-Firefox-based applications on the new platform, such as Thunderbird and SeaMonkey. In early 2018, UXP development was restarted with Firefox 52 ESR as the new basis, ultimately resulting in Pale Moon 28 later that year.

Data breach incident 
On 10 July 2019, a data breach was reported involving the Pale Moon archive server. This breach was discovered on the previous day, though it is unknown when it actually occurred. It is estimated to have occurred somewhere between April and June 2019. The archived releases of Pale Moon 27.6.2 and older were infected with malware. Basilisk and then-current Pale Moon releases were not affected. Straver expressed his distrust in the archive server host to provide adequate security and quickly switched to a new host.

New era 
On 10 March 2021, it was announced that macOS support would be discontinued, owing to a lack of consistency from community developers for the Mac platform. An effort was made to clean the Pale Moon and UXP codebases of all macOS-specific code.

In April of 2021, Straver announced that the next release of Pale Moon, version 29.2.0, would no longer allow the installation of extensions intended for Firefox. The decision was a significant departure from Pale Moon's previous, decade-long support for Firefox addons. In the preceding years, Moonchild Productions and collaborators had made efforts to raise and cultivate a unique ecosystem of addons for Pale Moon, ultimately desiring to break away from Firefox addons altogether. Pale Moon 29.2.0, serving as the culmination of this goal, was released on 27 April 2021, amid long-standing misgivings from developers and users alike.

In September of 2021, after controversy over third-party forks of Pale Moon and UXP, the publishing of Pale Moon and UXP source code was changed to a cathedral-style of tarballs upon release of binaries, instead of a publicly-available repository. Additionally, preview (unstable) releases were no longer distributed.

On 17 March 2022, Pale Moon 30 was released alongside the new Goanna Runtime Environment (GRE), and the source code to both Pale Moon and its platform was made readily available once again. Two days later, a core developer unexpectedly departed from the Pale Moon project, sabotaging the Pale Moon website and certain browser services in the process. Pale Moon 30, which depended upon the damaged project infrastructure, was recalled on 21 March 2022, and extra updates to Pale Moon 29.4 were released while damage control was underway. Future development of the GRE and Pale Moon 30 was deemed unviable, owing to the proprietary nature of the Goanna Runtime Environment's accompanying infrastructure, which remained under ownership of the departing core developer, as well as breaking platform code changes committed by this developer. On 28 March 2022, Straver decided to return to UXP as a platform base, abandoning both the GRE and Pale Moon 30 in favor of a new Pale Moon 31 milestone.

In April of 2022, macOS support was restored as part of an effort to return to certain aspects of the pre-Pale Moon 30 status quo.

On 10 May 2022, Pale Moon 31 was released, featuring restored support for traditional Firefox addons. After the ill-fated Pale Moon 30 milestone, Straver described Pale Moon 31 as "putting us back on course after various deviations."

Basilisk browser

The Basilisk web browser was previously considered a sibling to the Pale Moon browser, though it is now developed independently.

First released in 2017 by the Pale Moon team, it was intended as a development vessel for the then-new UXP platform. Basilisk includes additional features not found in Pale Moon and carries the Firefox 29-56 era interface ("Australis").

Releases are available for Microsoft Windows and Linux, with similar system requirements as Pale Moon. Basilisk is available for 32-bit and 64-bit Windows, as well as 64-bit Linux. It requires additional libraries on Linux. An unofficial version for macOS was maintained up to 11 June 2020, but was eventually discontinued on 10 March 2021.

Basilisk's support for add-ons and NPAPI plugins is largely similar to that of Pale Moon's, though notable differences exist. Basilisk's user interface and version number closely resembles Firefox 52 ESR, which can improve compatibility when attempting to install add-ons intended for Firefox. For some time, Basilisk included experimental support for Firefox WebExtensions, which Pale Moon has never supported, but this was removed in February 2019. Additionally, unlike Pale Moon, Basilisk has technological support for Widevine DRM and WebRTC. Both are currently non-functional, however, due to a lack of licensing from Google-controlled parties.

In December of 2021, Basilisk was discontinued, and an open offer was made by Moonchild Productions to transfer ownership of the project to any legitimate and reasonable developer who would be able to maintain it. The offer was retracted on 16 May 2022, after several false bids to acquire Basilisk. The final official Basilisk release from Moonchild Productions was 2022.01.27.

In July 2022 however, an announcement was made on the Pale Moon forums that a developer has purchased the rights to Basilisk's name and branding. The first public release under the new development team has been made in August 2022.

Benchmarks
In 2013, Pale Moon was a bit slower than Firefox in the ClubCompy Real-World Benchmark, with the browsers respectively scoring 8,168 and 9,344 points out of a possible 50,000. In a 2016 browser comparison test by Ghacks, Pale Moon version 25 had the smallest memory footprint after opening 10 different websites in separate tabs. However, in the same report Pale Moon scored bottom in the Mozilla Kraken, Google Octane, 32-bit RoboHornet tests and second-to-last in the 64-bit RoboHornet benchmarks. Whilst other browsers hung during some tests, Pale Moon only hung during the JetStream JavaScript benchmark.

Straver has remarked that the role of benchmark tests is questionable, stating that they "can't be used to draw hard (or regularly even any) conclusions. Plain and simple: they are an indication, nothing more. They serve well if you compare closely related siblings (e.g. Firefox and Iceweasel) or different builds of the exact same browser, to get a relative performance difference between the two on the limited subset of what is actually tested, but that's about as far as it goes."

The questionable role of benchmarking has been corroborated by major technology companies when, for example, Google announced it was retiring its Octane benchmark in 2017, and Mozilla indicating that they "believe these benchmarks are not representative of modern JS code" when introducing WarpBuilder in November 2020, admitting that their new technology "is currently slower than Ion on certain synthetic JS benchmarks such as Octane and Kraken".

Notable forks
Pale Moon has inspired a multitude of contributed and third-party forks, many of which seek to provide Pale Moon on platforms not officially supported by Moonchild Productions.

New Moon, by Roytam, maintains supports for Windows XP. Roytam additionally develops the Serpent browser, a fork of Basilisk that continues to support XP and Vista.
Arctic Fox, by wicknix, is a Pale Moon 27 fork which supports Mac OS X 10.6, PowerPC Linux, and Windows XP.
Mypal, by Feodor, maintained support for Windows XP. After a licensing dispute between Feodor and the Pale Moon team, Mypal switched to a Firefox 68 base.
White Star, by dbsoft, is a Pale Moon fork for macOS, coinciding with the removal of macOS-specific code from the official Pale Moon and UXP codebases. dbsoft has collaborated with Moonchild Productions to restore official macOS support for Pale Moon.

See also 

 Waterfox
 K-Meleon
 SeaMonkey
 XUL
 Timeline of web browsers
 History of the web browser

References

External links

2009 software
2017 software
Free FTP clients
Free software programmed in C++
Free web browsers
Linux web browsers
MacOS web browsers
News aggregator software
Portable software
Software forks
Software that uses XUL
Software using the Mozilla license
Web browsers based on Firefox
Windows web browsers